Viglino is a village in Lesnoy District of Tver Oblast, Russia.

References

Rural localities in Lesnoy District
Vesyegonsky Uyezd